The second season of the American television series Agents of S.H.I.E.L.D., based on the Marvel Comics organization S.H.I.E.L.D., follows Phil Coulson and his team of S.H.I.E.L.D. agents and allies as they attempt to rebuild the organization after it was revealed to have been infiltrated by Hydra in the film Captain America: The Winter Soldier (2014). The season is set in the Marvel Cinematic Universe (MCU) and acknowledges the continuity of the franchise's films and other television series. It was produced by ABC Studios, Marvel Television, and Mutant Enemy Productions, with Jed Whedon, Maurissa Tancharoen, and Jeffrey Bell serving as showrunners.

Clark Gregg reprises his role as Coulson from the film series, starring alongside the returning series regulars Ming-Na Wen, Brett Dalton, Chloe Bennet, Iain De Caestecker, and Elizabeth Henstridge. They are joined by Nick Blood and Adrianne Palicki. A second season of Agents of S.H.I.E.L.D. was ordered in May 2014, and production began in Culver City, California that July. Some episodes directly crossover with the television series Agent Carter and the film Avengers: Age of Ultron (2015), while the Inhumans were introduced to set up the planned film of the same name and connect to the film Guardians of the Galaxy (2014). Glenn Hetrick designed prosthetics for the Inhuman characters. Several actors reprise their MCU roles in the season for guest appearances.

The season aired on ABC from September 23, 2014, to May 12, 2015, and consists of 22 episodes. The season premiere was watched by 5.98 million people, less than half the viewing total for the first season premiere, which was watched by 12.12 million people, and overall the season had lower but much more consistent viewership than the previous season. It also received a much more positive critical response than the first season. The series was renewed for a third season in May 2015.

Episodes

Cast and characters

Main
 Clark Gregg as Phil Coulson
 Ming-Na Wen as Melinda May
 Brett Dalton as Grant Ward
 Chloe Bennet as Skye / Daisy Johnson
 Iain De Caestecker as Leo Fitz
 Elizabeth Henstridge as Jemma Simmons
 Nick Blood as Lance Hunter
 Adrianne Palicki as Bobbi Morse

Recurring
 B. J. Britt as Antoine Triplett
 Reed Diamond as Werner Reinhardt / Daniel Whitehall
 Henry Simmons as Alphonso "Mack" Mackenzie
 Patton Oswalt as Billy and Sam Koenig
 Adrian Pasdar as Glenn Talbot
 Simon Kassianides as Sunil Bakshi
 Kyle MacLachlan as Calvin Johnson 
 Ruth Negga as Raina
 Maya Stojan as Kara Palamas / Agent 33
 Dichen Lachman as Jiaying
 Jamie Harris as Gordon
 Christine Adams as Anne Weaver
 Edward James Olmos as Robert Gonzales
 Luke Mitchell as Lincoln Campbell

Notable guests
 Hayley Atwell as Peggy Carter
 Neal McDonough as Timothy "Dum Dum" Dugan
 Kenneth Choi as Jim Morita
 Dylan Minnette as Donnie Gill
 Tim DeKay as Christian Ward
 Henry Goodman as List
 Jaimie Alexander as Sif
 J. August Richards as Mike Peterson / Deathlok
 Cobie Smulders as Maria Hill

Production

Development
In March 2014, executive producer Jeffrey Bell stated at the Agents of S.H.I.E.L.D. PaleyFest panel that the writers are able to read the screenplays for upcoming Marvel Cinematic Universe films to know where the universe is heading, which allowed them to form a plan for the show through the end of a third season. On May 8, 2014, the series was renewed for a second season of 22 episodes.

Writing
In July 2014, Clark Gregg stated that the season resumes months after the end of season one, and "the monumental nature of [rebuilding S.H.I.E.L.D.] is made very clear almost immediately, because you realize everyone—US government, US military and other wise—wants to arrest us. S.H.I.E.L.D.'s illegal. We have very few resources. Everything we're going to do involves dealing with, still, finding out who's Hydra and who's not amongst our friends. To rebuild S.H.I.E.L.D., we're going to need some old friends to prove themselves, some new friends, and we're going to have to do it in a way that's very back alley, old school."

In September 2014, talking about whether the ending of the season would also be a satisfying end to the series, Bell said "we're not thinking of it as a series finale as much as a season finale ... I think we have some momentum coming in [to season 2] and I think we pick up on it. I'm optimistic that we can keep the plane in the air a little longer." He also talked about whether the themes of family and connectedness from the first season would be re-explored in the second, saying "What we always look for are the human elements in the big story. That's what television does well, it makes you care about people, and whether it's literal family or anytime you have a team of people working together, it takes on some sort of family metaphor." Bell reiterated the idea of family following the end of the season, saying "In many ways, the whole metaphor at the heart of the show is family—you've got Coulson and May and then a bunch of younger people, and it allows us to play out different dynamics; literally, this season, we had Skye's biological parents versus her surrogate parents. And at the same time, we had Skye growing up. We had her going from a slightly sulky hacker season one to training to become an agent to becoming our first full-fledged superhero and so as we grow up, we separate from our parents... In our minds, her mom wasn't a villain so much; she was an antagonist, but if you look at why she feels the way she does, Jiaying really earned that position." Discussing the reveal that Skye is actually Daisy Johnson, Maurissa Tancharoen explained thatJohnson is a character that we always liked. We always knew there was a potential to evolve Skye into something else. It took a little bit of time, but we were happy when we were able to land on Daisy Johnson, and actually have that work in our mythology. But as with everything that we do on the show, we pull from the properties, and we do our own spin to it. So we are kind of merging a few concepts and storylines. We've spent a season and a half with Skye. We've seen her evolve as a person, we've grown to like her as a person, we've seen her evolve as an agent. And now, finally bringing her to her origin story—I think there's just a lot more emotional weight to it, because you already know her as just Skye, and now she will have this ability that she may not understand, that she may not want ... We're going to focus on Skye, and how that affects the people around her, and how the relationships may shift. Because we've seen through the course of our series so far; we've spoken about how S.H.I.E.L.D. treats gifteds or views them, and they're categorized, things like that. What does that mean when one of your own is now considered someone with an ability? How do you categorize her?Whedon elaborated that "We're going to walk her through the steps of discovering what this really means, and coming to terms with it. All that stuff is really interesting to us, and in television, because we have time to explore, we can take her origin on all sorts of different paths." Additionally, Whedon talked about how the character would be referred to on the show after the reveal, saying, "She's still Skye, because she thinks she's Skye. I think her dad thinks she's Daisy, and we'll see if she ever gets to the point where she believes that that's something that she would want to call herself. But right now, she has her own identity."

In December 2014, Jed Whedon explained the benefits of introducing a society of superhuman characters in the Inhumans, saying "One of the things that, early on was very important to us last season was, there were so few people in the Cinematic Universe who had powers. Really, only two humans had powers, Captain America and the Hulk. We had to be very responsible—we didn't want to dive into this show and have a new one every week, and have it feel like we disregarded everything that they spent so much money and time building in the films. Along those same lines, the origin of a power is always a complex thing—Marvel cares about it feeling grounded, it feeling scientific at some level. Even on Thor, he says, "In our world, magic and science are the same thing." So this is a way for us to sort of open up our world. It's a way to introduce, into the MCU, the idea that people can be born with a power. They don't have to be engineered in a lab, they don't need to have some freak accident with a vat of acid. They can be born with this. That's sort of a gamechanger, not just on our show, but in the cinematic universe".

After the season finale, Bell talked about Coulson losing his arm, saying that "he paid a price—that was important to us. You don't mess with the forces of nature without getting bitten, and the fact that he literally saved everyone on the ship by that crystal not shattering was a wonderful, heroic thing and showed you that at heart, Coulson is a heroic man whose actions back up his words." Bell also talked about the cliffhanger involving Simmons being absorbed by a Kree monolith: "When we first started talking about the Monolith, we knew that it needed to present a threat and we needed to demonstrate some of that threat and the promise of more story... It's easy to kill a character for shock value or whatever, and we did have a number of deaths this season, but ... we prefer to leave you with something to talk about, to walk away with. This is something that came up in the room, we talked about what it meant ... The idea of getting Fitz and Simmons—who had been one person—to become two whole people, come back together, agree to go on a date, and then have this happen, felt beautifully poetic".

Casting

All principal cast members from the first season (Gregg as Phil Coulson, Ming-Na Wen as Melinda May, Brett Dalton as Grant Ward, Chloe Bennet as Skye, Iain De Caestecker as Leo Fitz, and Elizabeth Henstridge as Jemma Simmons) returned for the second season, and were joined by Nick Blood as Lance Hunter. In December 2014, main character Skye was revealed to be a version of Daisy Johnson. With the episode "Aftershocks", Adrianne Palicki, who portrays Bobbi Morse, was upgraded to a principal cast member. Also returning from earlier in the series are Christine Adams as Anne Weaver, Jaimie Alexander as Sif, B. J. Britt as Antoine Triplett, Imelda Corcoran as Goodman, Dylan Minnette as Donnie Gill, Ruth Negga as Raina, Patton Oswalt as Sam and Billy Koenig, Adrian Pasdar as Glenn Talbot, J. August Richards as Mike Peterson / Deathlok, and Cobie Smulders as Maria Hill.

At the San Diego Comic Con in July 2014, Reed Diamond was announced as portraying Daniel Whitehall. In August, Kyle MacLachlan was cast as Skye's father, in a recurring role. Initially referred to as "The Doctor", his character was revealed to be Calvin Zabo in December 2014. In "Making Friends and Influencing People", the character of Kara Palamas / Agent 33 was introduced, portrayed by Maya Stojan. She is also portrayed by other cast members, including Ming-Na Wen and Chloe Bennet, when she takes on the appearance of their characters. On October 1, 2014, Tim DeKay was cast as Senator Christian Ward, the older brother of principal character Grant Ward, who had previously appeared as a teenager through flashbacks in "The Well". In January 2015, Edward James Olmos was cast as Robert Gonzales, a leader of the "Real S.H.I.E.L.D." group. Mark Allan Stewart makes several appearances as another "Real S.H.I.E.L.D." leader, Agent Oliver. Other recurring guests include Jamie Harris as Gordon, Simon Kassianides as Sunil Bakshi, Dichen Lachman as Jiaying, Luke Mitchell as Lincoln Campbell, and Henry Simmons as Alphonso "Mack" Mackenzie.

Additionally, Hayley Atwell, Kenneth Choi, Henry Goodman, and Neal McDonough reprise their roles from MCU films and Marvel One-Shots, as Peggy Carter, Jim Morita, Dr. List, and Timothy "Dum Dum" Dugan, respectively, during the season.

Design
During the season, the producers worked with Glenn Hetrick of Optic Nerve Studios to help create Raina's Inhuman look, and introduce the Inhumans to the MCU. To get to the final look, the writers spent a lot of time discussing what her transformed look would entail, such as if she would have a nose, or a tail, with series writer Drew Greenberg eventually suggesting thorns. With the design idea in hand, Hetrick and his team began compiling potential designs for the character, looking to the Clive Barker film Nightbreed, specifically the character Shuna Sassi, because "She's a creature covered in porcupine quills and that image is so strong — it creates such a striking silhouette". Since Hetrick and his team did not have source material to pull from in the comics, he wanted to "make her feel like the first real Inhuman" and give her face a level of symmetry. When creating the prosthetic makeup, which was done in two weeks, the producers wanted to still be able to see Negga's eyes, with Bell saying, "Ruth Negga has amazingly expressive eyes and eyebrows. And she gets so much of who Raina is through the eyes. We wanted her to still be able to communicate, we still wanted you to feel her expressions through all of [the makeup]."

For the "real S.H.I.E.L.D." faction introduced this season, the producers and Marvel decided to create a new S.H.I.E.L.D. logo, to differentiate from the normal one used on the series. This new logo uses the shape of Captain America's original shield, as opposed to the updated round shape, and has 3 stars on it.

Filming
Production on the season began in late July 2014, in Culver City, California. Additional photography took place around the world, including in Old San Juan, Puerto Rico for "...Ye Who Enter Here" and "What They Become".

Music
To reflect the darker tone of the second season, the standard orchestra was changed from season one, with the low brass and strings expanded, and the woodwind section reduced, "giving [the orchestra] added punch and menace." Composer Bear McCreary's use of the electric guitar was also reduced for the second season, while his general synth programming was changed from "warm, round tones" to "mangled under heavy distortion" sound.

McCreary introduced a new Hydra theme for the season, explaining that "Last season got pretty musically complicated. I had a theme that associated itself with Centipede, The Clairvoyant, John Garrett and Raina. That theme ultimately functioned like a Hydra Theme. I had a theme for Victoria Hand that, while the audience briefly suspected her, also functioned as the Hydra Theme. I had a[nother] theme for Garrett that also acted like the theme for Hydra. It got so complicated ... The answer was obvious: I needed to write a new Hydra Theme, one that could be associated with Dr. Whitehall." For Hayley Atwell's appearances as Peggy Carter, McCreary decided to quote the Agent Carter theme composed by Christopher Lennertz for the Agent Carter short film. On using Lennertz's theme, McCreary said, "I was excited for the opportunity to incorporate his music into my S.H.I.E.L.D. score, because it further cements the Marvel [Cinematic] Universe together as a coherent whole ... Chris was thrilled and sent me his scores for reference." The soundtrack titled Marvel's Agents of S.H.I.E.L.D. (Original Soundtrack Album) featuring music from the first and second seasons was released by Marvel Music digitally on September 4, 2015, and on CD in October 2015.

Marvel Cinematic Universe tie-ins
Executive producer Maurissa Tancharoen stated the production team was not ruling out creating crossover episodes with Agent Carter or Guardians of the Galaxy during the season, with executive producer Jed Whedon adding that any such episodes would not equal the scale seen in the Captain America: The Winter Soldier crossover from the first season, saying, "In terms of game-changers, [those episodes are] hard to beat." Bell later said Avengers: Age of Ultron "is coming up and we know what's going on with that and look forward to seeing it, but it's pretty cool to find ways to tie-in stuff and connect things." In December 2014, ABC confirmed the series would tie-in with Avengers: Age of Ultron, with Whedon saying, "You should expect something. The Avengers is the big tent that all the franchises play under. Obviously, we're included in that." The episodes "The Frenemy of My Enemy" and "The Dirty Half Dozen" feature "Easter eggs, plot threads and other connective tissue leading into the opening scene of Avengers: Age of Ultron" while "Scars" explores the aftermath of the film.

Talking on how the season would interact with Agent Carter, Bell said, "Here's what I think is interesting. Agent Carter seems to be about S.S.R. pre-S.H.I.E.L.D., but about the beginnings of something, and the basic values of that. S.H.I.E.L.D. got blown up last year and what Coulson always wanted was a return to basics, and it gives us an opportunity to return to some of those core values and even physically, some of that S.S.R. stuff has a way of finding its way into our show that could be cool. Anyway we can tie things together, we're going to try to do it, but it is hard when the stories are 60 years apart." Several scenes in "Shadows" and "The Things We Bury" are flashbacks featuring Peggy Carter which serve as an introduction to the world of Agent Carter, setting up characters and ideas for that series, including Carter's belief in the need for "a permanent unit during peacetime", which will lead to the creation of S.H.I.E.L.D. The episode "Making Friends and Influencing People" names Hydra's ability to brainwash people as the Faustus Method, named for the character who appears, as Johann Fennhoff, in Agent Carter, played by Ralph Brown.

The season confirms that the blue alien seen in the first season, and a recurring plot point this season, was a member of the Kree race, who play a significant role in Guardians of the Galaxy. Whedon explained that "We obviously showed this body a year ago at around this time. When we were breaking that and sussing out what this arc would be, we had to have a lot of the pieces in place from the get go ... we had to talk to features about what their plans were and where they were going." When asked whether this counts as the series tie-in to Guardians of the Galaxy, Whedon said "It is a very far away other galaxy, so it's a little bit harder to have one of them walk into our set, so a direct tie-in is a little bit more challenging, but it's all one universe, so there's always opportunity for more. ... In Guardians, we saw parts in our universe that we hadn't explored yet, so it shows we're a part of that too." This storyline also introduces the Inhumans to the MCU, ahead of their own film that was planned.

At the end of the season, Bell stated on the way that the season had tied in with the films, "we got to be our own show and tell our own stories in the Marvel Cinematic Universe and do a nice hand off or a tie-in, but neither are incumbent upon the other to be a follow, and I think that's a great model for us."

Marketing

At the 2014 San Diego Comic-Con, ahead of the premiere of the season, Marvel Custom Solutions and Lexus released a limited single-issue comic tie-in titled Agents of S.H.I.E.L.D.: The Chase, set between the season 1 episodes "Seeds" and "T.R.A.C.K.S.", written by George Kitson, and with art by  Mirko Colak, Neil Edwards, and Mirco Pierfederici. On October 10, 2014, "Face My Enemy" was screened at New York Comic Con.

"The Art of Evolution"
For the final twelve episodes of the season, Marvel once again ran the "Art of..." initiative, in which a different image was released each Thursday before a new episode, depicting a first look at a key event from the upcoming episode, with the season's title being "The Art of Evolution". The different artists were once again chosen to create the teaser posters, based on their previous work and how it connected to the themes and emotion of the intended episode. On how what is shown on each poster is chosen, Bell said, "maybe we'll show [the artist] the script or let them watch the episode and let them respond to it emotionally and see what's interesting to them. And then we have a conversation with them about how we'd like to portray that, and then we try to lean into the strengths that they have. Some are more graphic, some are more character based, some are more composite, and some are cleaner. And that's one of the things [the producers] really look forward to each week, getting the initial sketches back from the artists and seeing their interpretation." The art once again appeared as variant covers to select titles published by Marvel Comics in June 2015.

The poster for "Aftershocks", created by Gabriele Dell'Otto, the co-creator of Daisy Johnson, depicts Skye twice, as she is transforming from the Terrigen mist and as the person dealing with her powers, as well as a transformed Raina, Coulson and the S.H.I.E.L.D. logo in the background. For "Who You Really Are", the producers enlisted Marcos Martín to create the poster, which highlighted Sif's (Jaimie Alexander) return to the show, as well as an "inside look" at S.H.I.E.L.D. as the logo crumbles, with Skye in the center of it, ambiguously leaving the viewer questioning if the logo was crumbling due to Sif's sword, or Skye's powers. The third poster, for "One of Us", was created by Declan Shalvey and Jordie Bellaire. It features muted colors and shows "Coulson surrounded by villains [from the S.H.I.E.L.D. index], and the giant Cal looming over, and [a bird and] S.H.I.E.L.D. behind him." Annie Wu was brought on for the "Love in the Time of Hydra" poster, which shows Grant Ward holding a woman, though depicts her as two; one drawn in red, the other in blue – "half of that goes to Agent 33, who has two faces... And it also goes to the fact that she's been imitating other people as she did with Agent May."

"One Door Closes", an episode focused on Bobbi Morse's history, received a poster of her with the "real S.H.I.E.L.D." logo, that "embraced the basics" of four-color printing, utilizing magenta, cyan, black and yellow, while still having layers and complications, much like the character of Morse. The poster was designed by Delicious Design League. The poster for "Afterlife" by Dave Johnson, highlights the divide within S.H.I.E.L.D. and the alliances on each side. With Coulson in the middle, Agents Gonzales, Morse, Mackenzie and Weaver stem from the "real S.H.I.E.L.D.", while Hunter, Fitz and Simmons stem from the other. "Melinda"s poster, by Jenny Frison, mirrored the focus of the episode by prominently featuring an image of May, highlighting her backstory and why she is called "the Cavalry". Marvel teamed with Nathan Fox on the poster for "The Frenemy of My Enemy", which depicts Ward, Kara, and Bakshi in "Hydra red"; Coulson, Hunter, and Fitz in "S.H.I.E.L.D. blue"; and Deathlok neutral. They are all featured together, just as the season is "starting to put [all of its plotlines] together in new combinations in new ways, [to] propel us into the last four episodes."

As alluded to by the episode title, the poster for "The Dirty Half Dozen", with art by Jake Wyatt, sees the original recruits to Coulson's S.H.I.E.L.D. team from the first season (May, Ward, Fitz, Simmons and Skye), along with Coulson, together once again, suiting up for a mission together; it is also the first poster of the "Art of..." series to feature the episode title on the poster. Marguerite Sauvage provided the poster for "Scars", which prominently features Jiaying and her scars in a way that the series cannot do with special effects, while also depicting Skye near the former's stomach to cement the maternal connection between them. For Part One of the season finale, "S.O.S", Ryan Sook's poster hints at Cal's transformation into the Mr. Hyde persona from the comics, in an homage to traditional comic book covers. For Part Two, artist Joshua Budich brought together all of the main players of the season, divided into Coulson and his team, and those who served as antagonists to them throughout the season (though not necessarily villains), with Skye and some Terrigen crystals in the middle, pointing to Skye's confused allegiances and the importance of the crystals in the finale.

Release

Broadcast
In June 2014, Clark Gregg stated he believed the season would be shown in a block of 10 episodes, then breaking for Agent Carter, before airing the remaining 12. Explaining this decision, Bell said, One of our challenges last year was to produce 22 episodes that aired over, what, 40 weeks? 36 weeks? Something like that. And the age of re-runs is dead. Re-runs are death, and so you're trying to commit to the habit of the show and [viewers] tune in to something else or a re-run and they'll get pissed off. They'll go away. What this allows us to do is minimize repeats. We're showing ten episodes, and there has to be a gap or two because it's physically impossible to produce ten shows and get through post production in time, we can't do that so there's going to be a Marvel special at some point. But pretty much every week you're showing up and we're there, and then instead of a repeat showing up mid-run and losing momentum, Agent Carter comes in and has its own cool stuff, and they're running eight weeks in a row, then we can come back and run twelve in a row with no interruptions. We're still producing our show every week but it just gives us time, barely, to finish 22 on schedule. It takes out the need for repeats in the back half.

The season began airing on September 23, 2014, on ABC in the United States, and on CTV in Canada, and concluded on May 12, 2015. In Australia, the season debuted on September 29, 2014, on Seven Network, while Channel 4 in the United Kingdom premiered the season on October 24, 2014.

Home media
The season began streaming on Netflix in the United States on June 11, 2015, and was available until February 28, 2022. It was released on Blu-ray and DVD as an Amazon.com exclusive on September 18, 2015. It became available on Disney+ in the United States on March 16, 2022, joining other territories where it was already available on the service.

Reception

Ratings

The season averaged 7.09 million total viewers, including from DVR, ranking 76th among network series in the 2014–15 television season. It also had an average total 18-49 rating of 2.7, which was 32nd.

Critical response
The review aggregator website Rotten Tomatoes reports a 91% approval rating with an average score of 7.66/10, based on 33 reviews. The website's consensus reads, "Marvel's Agents of S.H.I.E.L.D. relaxes into itself during its sophomore season, mitigating the show's growing pains by focusing on characters while amping up narrative thrills."

Marc Buston for Den of Geek scored the premiere episode 4.5 stars out of 5, feeling that the series had finally reached its potential by incorporating Marvel elements such as Creel and Whitehall, while also creating a darker tone and developing the original characters. He specifically highlighted the changes made to Fitz' character, saying "This lair of tragedy greatly deepens Fitz's character and gives the comic relief of last season a heartbreaking edge." James Hunt, also for Den of Geek, gave a positive review as well, stating "The momentum of last season's finale hasn't been lost, and indeed, it's even been added to. Last year I criticised the pilot episode for, above all else, failing to recreate the feel of the Marvel Cinematic Universe. This year, it's only fair that I praise the season opener for doing exactly that." Kevin Fitzpatrick at Screen Crush called the premiere "unexpectedly good", noting that the series "remains as serialized a show as it can over 22 episodes", introducing new and interesting ideas for the rest of the season, while also setting a high standard for subsequent episodes to meet.

Alan Sepinwall at HitFix called the episode a promising start to the season, "a fairly lively hour in spite of [a lot of exposition], helped by some good casting and smart creative choices". He was positive about both the changes to the existing characters and the introduction of the new ones, and though he noted that the opening sequence was "itself a piece of brand extension — early promotion for Agent Carter," he felt that "Links to the rest of the Marvel [Cinematic U]niverse are always welcome when they're in service to the story the show is telling". Eric Goldman of IGN scored the episode an 8.3 out of 10, praising the visual style, which he called "less glossy" than previous episodes, as well as the introduction of new characters and development of old ones, especially the introduction of Carl Creel and the "nicely done FX showing off his power". Oliver Sava of The A.V. Club graded the episode a 'B−', feeling that "With a clearly defined villain and mission statement, this show's second season is already off to a better start than its first year, but there's still plenty of room for the series to grow. The scripts could use more energy, the action could be better choreographed, and it could use a huge injection of style for both the visual and audio elements. There's so much potential in Agents Of S.H.I.E.L.D. ... but the show's creators aren't fully exploring it yet."

At the end of the season, Goldman graded it an 8.2 out of 10, saying the season "found the show much-improved, as it moved faster and delved deeper into the Marvel Cinematic Universe." Compared to the first season, Goldman felt the "pacing was hugely improved, with storylines no longer taking forever to bubble up again and secrets no longer being kept both from the audience and the characters," with content from the first season being resolved, while still introducing new plot lines and mysteries to play out over the season. He also praised the characterization improvement and called the season "less restrained" in connecting to its comics roots. While he appreciated the new characters that join the series, specifically MacLachlan's portrayal of Cal, he felt Triplett was "never fully utilized", which made his death in the midseason finale less impactful. Additionally, Goldman criticized the tie-in to Age of Ultron, calling it "forced" and distracting from the Inhuman/S.H.I.E.L.D. 2.0 storylines. Nick Hogan at TV Overmind rated the season 9 out of 10 stars, calling it, "for the most part, a very enjoyable season of television." Hogan praised that cast and characters, particularly MacLachlan's portrayal of Calvin Zabo, saying "He had perhaps the strongest character arc of anyone this season, and it was such a pleasure to watch." He did criticize some of the story direction, feeling that it took a while for the Inhumans to connect to the rest of the series, and that the way the Age of Ultron tie-in concluded the S.H.I.E.L.D. vs. S.H.I.E.L.D. storyline was "rushed and choppy".

Analysis
The season's introduction of the Inhumans and apparent willingness to establish new norms ahead of the films has been highlighted by critics:

Sava felt that having the series introduce the race made Agents of S.H.I.E.L.D. "an essential part of Marvel Studios' bigger plans for the future", explaining that "the series has become more and more connected to the larger MCU since Captain America: The Winter Soldier, but it's always been in a reactive role. Stuff happens in the movies, and Agents Of S.H.I.E.L.D. deals with the fallout. Not anymore. This show is making things happen, and these events will clearly impact the future of the MCU because we know there's an Inhumans movie planned for 2019." Sava also mentioned that introducing the Inhumans "on a personal level rather than a cosmic level" via the television series makes "the whole idea a bit easier to swallow" for the general MCU audience.

Merrill Barr of Forbes thought that by not only introducing the Inhumans ahead of the film, but by depicting the spreading of the race throughout the world, was part of the series cementing its "right to exist" apart from the films. Talking about the season finale, Barr said, "S.H.I.E.L.D. does a most excellent job of standing on its own two feet in a way we've never seen it do before. Come the final frame, all anyone – Marvel fan or otherwise – will be asking is when season three begins. The note the show leaves viewers on is one that will make them realize, perhaps for the first time, that the journey of Agents of S.H.I.E.L.D. is not only worth it now, but perhaps always has been."

Accolades

|-
! scope="row" rowspan="8" | 2015
| People's Choice Awards
| Favorite Network Sci-Fi/Fantasy TV Show
| Agents of S.H.I.E.L.D.
| 
| 
|-
| Visual Effects Society Awards
| Outstanding Visual Effects in a Broadcast Program
| Agents of S.H.I.E.L.D.
| 
| 
|-
| rowspan="2" | Kids' Choice Awards
| Favorite Family TV Show
| Agents of S.H.I.E.L.D.
| 
| 
|-
| Favorite TV Actress
| Chloe Bennet
| 
| 
|-
| Saturn Award
| Best Superhero Adaptation Television Series
| Agents of S.H.I.E.L.D.
| 
| 
|-
| PRISM Awards
| Television Drama Multi-Episode Storyline – Mental Health
| Fitz's storyline from "Shadows" to "The Things We Bury"
| 
| 
|-
| Teen Choice Awards
| Choice Fantasy/Sci-Fi Series
| Agents of S.H.I.E.L.D.
| 
| 
|-
| Primetime Creative Arts Emmy Awards
| Outstanding Special and Visual Effects
| "The Dirty Half Dozen"
| 
| 
|-
! scope="row" | 2016
| Irish Film & Television Awards
| Best Actress in a Supporting Role in Drama Television
| Ruth Negga
| 
| 
|}

Notes

References

General references

External links
 

 
2014 American television seasons
2015 American television seasons